Vincenzo Mantelli (born 26 June 1889, date of death unknown) was an Italian racing cyclist. He rode in the 1923 Tour de France.

References

1889 births
Year of death missing
Italian male cyclists
Place of birth missing